The Demi-Brigade of the Foreign Legion, existed briefly in Indochina while regrouping the ensemble of the Battalion Forming Corps issued from the 1st Foreign Infantry Regiment 1er REI. The Demi-Brigade would become on September 1, 1930, the 5th Foreign Infantry Regiment.

Creation and different nominations 

 August 2, 1930: formation of the Demi-Brigade of the Foreign Legion;
 On September 1, 1930 : change in designation from Demi-Brigade to 5th Foreign Infantry Regiment (5e REI).

History, garrisons, campaigns and battles

On September 1, 1930, the BFC of the 1st Foreign Infantry Regiment 1er REI and the 1st battalion of the 1er REI newly arrived in the Far East allowed the constitution of four battalions of the 5th Foreign Infantry Regiment 5e REI:

 The 4e BFC became the I/5e REI : 1st battalion of the 5e REI
 The 7e BFC became the II/5e REI: 2nd battalion of the 5e REI
 The 9e BFC became the III/5e REI : 3rd battalion of the 5e REI
 The 1st battalion of the 1er REI became the IIII/ 5e REI : 4th battalion of the 5e REI
Nevertheless, the BFC (Battalion Forming Corps) remained until April 1, 1931.

Traditions

Regimental Commanders 

Demi-Brigade of the Foreign Legion in Indochina ( August 2 to 31 1930).
 1930 : Lieutenant-colonel Debas Jean.
9e BFC of the 1er REI
 1926: Chef de bataillon Prieur.
 1927: Chef de bataillon  Maire.
 1929: Chef de bataillon Lorillard
7e BFC of the 1er REI
 1927 - 1929: Chef de bataillon Boutry		
 1929 - 1930: Chef de bataillon Kratzert		
4e BFC of the 1er REI
 1930: Chef de bataillon Lambert.

See also 

Major (France)
French Foreign Legion Music Band (MLE)
Armored Train of the Foreign Legion
Disciplinary Company of the Foreign Regiments in the Far East

References

Bibliographies:
 Historique du régiment du Tonkin - D'après : l'historique du 5e REI 1883 - 1959, les articles de Georges d'Ossau, publiés dans KB de 1956 à 1957 et de 1963 à nos jours, les JMO du 5e RMP  de 1963 à 2000 (ouvrage collectif - Imp Seripole - 1991)
 5e Etranger - Historique du régiment du Tonkin T 1 - Ed Lavauzelle - Collectif (Cne (er) Mahuault, aspirant Lafaye (thèse de doctorat en histoire), lieutenant-colonel Peron, missionnés par le commandement de la Légion étrangère.
Légionnaires et bâtisseurs, L'Harmattan, 2006 Jean-Paul Mahuault
 Plaquette pour cérémonie de dissolution du 5e RE en 2000 - Collectif KB - Droits réservés SAMLE Rédacteur
 Répertoire des chefs de corps - Centre de documentation de la Légion étrangère.

Defunct French Foreign Legion units
Military units and formations established in 1930
Military units and formations disestablished in 1930